Carlo Bonfanti (7 July 1875 – 7 December 1933) was an Italian diver. He competed at the 1908 Summer Olympics and the 1912 Summer Olympics.

Bonfanti, born in Milan in 1875, was among the first competitive divers in his country's history. He was affiliated with Nettuno Milano and was selected to compete at the 1906 Intercalated Games, the 1908 and 1912 Olympics. Early in his career, diving was regarded as only entertainment in Italy, but his international appearances changed how the sport was viewed in the nation. After retiring, Bonfanti was in Milano an instructor. He died in 1933, after suffering a heart attack while mountain climbing.

References

1875 births
1933 deaths
Italian male divers
Olympic divers of Italy
Divers at the 1906 Intercalated Games
Divers at the 1908 Summer Olympics
Divers at the 1912 Summer Olympics
Divers from Milan